is a Japanese voice actress primarily for visual novels.

Voice roles
Otome wa Boku ni Koishiteru as Yukari Kamioka
Shuffle!, Tick Tack!, and Really? Really! as Nerine
Haru no Ashioto
School Days as Otome Katō
Sakura Bitmap as Hiyama Riko
Tayutama: Kiss on my Deity as Kikuramikami no Hime

External links
Yuki Matsunaga's personal website 

Japanese voice actresses
Living people
Year of birth missing (living people)